The Brabham BT20 is a Formula One car used by the Brabham Formula One team in  and , as well as a number of privateers from  to .

The BT20 was driven in 7 out of the 9 races of Brabham's Constructors' Championship winning season in 1966, and the first three races en route to another championship in 1967.

The BT20 was very successful in these seasons, scoring 7 podiums and one win (at the 1967 Monaco Grand Prix) in its first 10 entries.

The BT20 was succeeded by the Brabham BT24.

Complete Formula One World Championship results
(key) (results in bold indicate pole position; results in italics indicate fastest lap)

* Ligier finished 8th in the 1967 German Grand Prix, but was awarded the point for 6th place as the two F2 drivers who finished ahead of him on the road were ineligible to score points

** Only 6 of the points which counted towards Brabham-Repco's 1966 Championship total were scored using the BT20; the remainder were scored using the BT19. Only 13 of the points which counted towards Brabham-Repco's 1967 Championship total were scored using the BT20; the remainder were scored using the BT19 and BT24. Only 2 of Brabham-Repco's 1968 points were scored using the BT20; the remainder were scored using the BT24 and BT26.

References

1966 Formula One season cars
1967 Formula One season cars
1968 Formula One season cars
1969 Formula One season cars
Brabham Formula One cars